South Newbald is a hamlet in the East Riding of Yorkshire, England. It lies to the east of the A1034 road. The larger village of North Newbald is just to the north.

In 1823 South Newbald was in the civil parish of North Newbald, the Wapentake of Harthill and the Liberty of St Peter's. Population at the time was 179, with occupations including seven farmers & yeomen and three corn millers. Resident was a banker, an overseer, and the vicar of North Newbald.

Governance
South Newbald forms part of the civil parish of Newbald.

The hamlet was in the Haltemprice and Howden  parliamentary constituency until the 2010 general election when it was transferred to the constituency of Beverley and Holderness.

References

Villages in the East Riding of Yorkshire